The 2008 Conference Premier play-off Final, known as the 2008 Blue Square Premier play-off Final for sponsorship purposes, took place on 18 May 2008 at Wembley Stadium, London. It was contested between Cambridge United and Exeter City, with Exeter winning 1–0 and securing their return to the Football League after five years' absence.

This was the third successive Conference play-off final for Adam Stansfield, and the second one in which he featured for the winning team.

Match

Details

References

Play-off Final
Play-off Final 2008
Play-off Final 2008
National League (English football) play-off finals
Conference Premier play-off Final
National League play-off final
Events at Wembley Stadium